Ernest Tché-Noubossie (born 26 August 1956) is a Cameroonian sprinter. He competed in the men's 400 metres at the 1988 Summer Olympics.

References

1956 births
Living people
Athletes (track and field) at the 1984 Summer Olympics
Athletes (track and field) at the 1988 Summer Olympics
Cameroonian male sprinters
Cameroonian male long jumpers
Cameroonian male triple jumpers
Olympic athletes of Cameroon
Place of birth missing (living people)